Tengrism (also known as Tengriism, Tengerism, or Tengrianism) is an ethnic and old state Turko-Mongolic religion originating in the Eurasian steppes, based on folk shamanism, animism and generally centered around the titular sky god Tengri. Tengri was not considered a deity in the usual sense, but a personification of the universe. The purpose of life is, according to the Tengris view, to live in harmony with the universe.

It was the prevailing religion of the Turks, Mongols, Bulgars, Xiongnu, Huns and possibly the Hungarians, and the state religion of several medieval states: First Turkic Khaganate, Western Turkic Khaganate, Eastern Turkic Khaganate, Old Great Bulgaria, First Bulgarian Empire, Volga Bulgaria, and Eastern Tourkia (Khazaria), Mongol Empire. According to many academics, Tengrism was a predominantly polytheistic religion based on shamanistic concept of animism, and during the imperial period, especially by the 12th–13th centuries, Tengrism was mostly monotheistic. Abdulkadir Inan argues that Yakut and Altai shamanism are not entirely equal to the ancient Turkic religion.

The term also describes several contemporary Turko-Mongolic native religious movements and teachings. All modern adherents of "political" Tengrism are monotheists.

Tengrism has been advocated in intellectual circles of the Turkic nations of Central Asia (Kyrgyzstan with Kazakhstan) and Russia (Tatarstan, Bashkortostan) since the dissolution of the Soviet Union during the 1990s. Still practiced, it is undergoing an organized revival in Buryatia, Sakha (Yakutia), Khakassia, Tuva and other Turkic nations in Siberia. Altaian Burkhanism and Chuvash Vattisen Yaly are movements similar to Tengrism.

The term tengri can either refer to the sky deity or refer also to other deities (compare this with the concept of Kami). Tengrism includes the worship of the tngri (gods), with Gök Tengri (Heaven, God of Heaven). While other deities, such as Ülgen or Kaira, are personified gods, Tengri is an "abstract phenomenon".

In the Mongolian folk religion, Genghis Khan is considered one of the embodiments, if not the main embodiment, of Tengri's will.

Terminology and relationship with shamanism

The forms of the name Tengri among the ancient and modern Turks and Mongols are Tengeri, Tangara, Tangri, Tanri, Tangre, Tegri, Tingir, Tenkri, Tangra, Teri, Ter, and Ture. Meanwhile, Stefan Georg proposed that the Turkic Tengri ultimately originates as a loanword from Proto-Yeniseian *tɨŋgɨr- "high". Mongolia is sometimes poetically called the "Land of Eternal Blue Sky" by its inhabitants. According to some scholars, the name of the important deity Dangun (also Tangol) (God of the Mountains) of the Korean folk religion is related to the Siberian Tengri ("Heaven"), while the bear is a symbol of the Big Dipper (Ursa Major).

The word "Tengrism" is a fairly new term. The spelling Tengrism for the religion of the ancient Turks is found in the works of the 19th century Kazakh Russophone ethnographer Shoqan Walikhanov. The term was introduced into a wide scientific circulation in 1956 by Jean-Paul Roux and later in the 1960s as a general term of English-language papers.

Tengrianism is a reflection of the Russian term,  ("Tengriánstvo"). It is introduced by Kazakh poet and turkologist Olzhas Suleymenov in his 1975 book AZ-and-IA. Since the 1990s, Russian-language literature uses it in the general sense, as for instance, reported in 1996 ("so-called Tengrianism") in the context of the nationalist rivalry over Bulgar legacy.

The spellings Tengriism, Tangrism, Tengrianity are also found from the 1990s. Mongolian  is used in a 1999 biography of Genghis Khan.

In the 20th century, a number of scientists proposed the existence of a religious imperial khagan cult in the ancient Turkic and Mongolian states. The Turkish historian of religion Ziya Gökalp (1876–1924) wrote in his The History of Turkish Holy Tradition and Turkish Civilization that the religion of the ancient Turkic states could not be primitive shamanism, which was only a magical part of the religion of the ancient Türks (see a historiography of the problem).

The nature of this religion remains debatable. According to many scholars, it was originally polytheistic, but a monotheistic branch with the sky god Kök-Tengri as the supreme being evolved as a dynastical legitimation. It is at least agreed that Tengrism formed from the diverse folk religions of the local people and may have had diverse branches.

It is suggested that Tengrism was a monotheistic religion only at the imperial level in aristocratic circles,  and, perhaps, only by the 12th-13th centuries (a late form of development of ancient animistic shamanism in the era of the Mongol empire).

According to Jean-Paul Roux, the monotheistic concept evolved later out of a polytheistic system and was not the original form of Tengrism. The monotheistic concept helped to legitimate the rule of the dynasty: "As there is only one God in Heaven, there can only be one ruler on the earth ...".

Others point out that Tengri itself was never an Absolute, but only one of many gods of the upper world, the sky deity, of polytheistic shamanism, later known as Tengrism.

Tengrism differs from contemporary Siberian shamanism in that it was a more organized religion. Additionally the polities practicing it were not small bands of hunter-gatherers like the Paleosiberians, but a continuous succession of pastoral, semi-sedentarized khanates and empires from the Xiongnu Empire (founded 209 BC) to the Mongol Empire (13th century). In Mongolia it survives as a synthesis with Tibetan Buddhism while surviving in purer forms around Lake Khovsgol and Lake Baikal. Unlike Siberian shamanism, which has no written tradition, Tengrism can be identified from Turkic and Mongolic historical texts like the Orkhon inscriptions, Secret History of the Mongols, and Altan Tobchi. However, these texts are more historically oriented and are not strictly religious texts like the scriptures and sutras of sedentary civilizations, which have elaborate doctrines and religious stories.

On a scale of complexity Tengrism lies somewhere between the Proto-Indo-European religion (a pre-state form of pastoral shamanism on the western steppe) and its later form the Vedic religion. The chief god Tengri ("Heaven") is considered strikingly similar to the Indo-European sky god *Dyḗus and the East Asian Tian (Chinese: "Sky; Heaven"). The structure of the reconstructed Proto-Indo-European religion is actually closer to that of the early Turks than to the religion of any people of neolithic European, Near Eastern or Mediterranean antiquity.

The term "shamanism" was first applied by Western anthropologists as outside observers of the ancient religion of the Turks and Mongols, as well as those of the neighbouring Tungusic and Samoyedic-speaking peoples. Upon observing more religious traditions across the world, some Western anthropologists began to also use the term in a very broad sense. The term was used to describe unrelated magico-religious practices found within the ethnic religions of other parts of Asia, Africa, Australasia and even completely unrelated parts of the Americas, as they believed these practices to be similar to one another.

Terms for 'shaman' and 'shamaness' in Siberian languages:
'shaman': saman (Nedigal, Nanay, Ulcha, Orok), sama (Manchu). The variant /šaman/ (i.e., pronounced "shaman") is Evenk (whence it was borrowed into Russian).
'shaman': alman, olman, wolmen (Yukagir)
'shaman':  (Tatar, Shor, Oyrat),  (Tuva, Tofalar)
The Buryat word for shaman is бөө (böö) , from early Mongolian böge.
'shaman': ńajt (Khanty, Mansi), from Proto-Uralic *nojta (cf. Sámi noaidi)
'shamaness':  (Mongol),  (Yakut), udagan (Buryat), udugan (Evenki, Lamut), odogan (Nedigal). Related forms found in various Siberian languages include utagan, ubakan, utygan, utügun, iduan, or duana. All these are related to the Mongolian name of Etügen, the hearth goddess, and Etügen Eke 'Mother Earth'. Maria Czaplicka points out that Siberian languages use words for male shamans from diverse roots, but the words for female shaman are almost all from the same root. She connects this with the theory that women's practice of shamanism was established earlier than men's, that "shamans were originally female".

Buryat scholar Irina S. Urbanaeva developed a theory of Tengrist esoteric traditions in Central Asia after the collapse of the Soviet Union and the revival of national sentiment in the former Soviet republics of Central Asia.

Historical Tengrism

The first time the name Tengri was recorded in Chinese chronicles was from the 4th century BC as the sky god of the Xiongnu, using the Chinese form 撑犁 (Cheng-li).

Tengrism formed from the various Turkic and Mongolic folk religions, which had a diverse number of deities, spirits and gods. Turkic folk religion was based on Animism and similar to various other religious traditions of Siberia, Central Asia and Northeast Asia. Ancestor worship played an important part in Tengrism.

The cult of Heaven-Tengri is fixed by the Orkhon, or Old Turkic script used by the Göktürks ("celestial Turks") and other early khanates during the 8th to 10th centuries.

Tengrism was the religion of several medieval states, such as the Göktürk Khaganate, Western Turkic Khaganate, Old Great Bulgaria, Danube Bulgaria, Volga Bulgaria, and Eastern Tourkia (Khazaria) Turkic beliefs contains the sacral book Irk Bitig from Uyghur Khaganate.

Tengrism also played a large role in the religion of Mongol Empires as the primary state spirituality. Genghis Khan and several generations of his followers were Tengrian believers and "Shaman-Kings" until his fifth-generation descendant, Uzbeg Khan, turned to Islam in the 14th century. Old Tengrist prayers have come to us from the Secret History of the Mongols (13th century). The priests-prophets (temujin) received them, according to their faith, from the great deity/spirit Munkh Tenger.

Tengrism was probably similar with the folk traditions of the Tungusic peoples, such as the Manchu folk religion. Similarities with Korean shamanism and Wuism as well as Japanese Shinto are also evident.

According to Hungarian archaeological research, the religion of the Magyars (Hungarians) until the end of the 10th century (before Christianity) was a form of Tengrism and Shamanism.

Tengrists view their existence as sustained by the eternal blue sky (Tengri), the fertile mother-earth spirit (Eje) and a ruler regarded as the chosen one by the holy spirit of the sky. Heaven, earth, spirits of nature and ancestors provide for every need and protect all humans. By living an upright, respectful life, a human will keep his world in balance and perfect his personal Wind Horse, or spirit. The Huns of the northern Caucasus reportedly believed in two gods: Tangri Han (or Tengri Khan), considered identical to the Persian Esfandiyār and for whom horses were sacrificed, and Kuar (whose victims are struck by lightning).

Traditional Tengrism was more embraced by the nomadic Turks than by those residing in the lower mountains or forests. This belief influenced Turkic and Mongol religious history since ancient times until the 14th Century, when the Golden Horde converted to Islam. Since then, Tengrism was mostly submerged by other religious ideas. Traditional Tengrism persists among the Mongols and in some Turko-Mongolian regions of Russia (Sakha, Buryatia, and Tuva) in parallel with other religions.

Orkhon inscriptions
According to the Orkhon inscriptions, Tengri played a big role in choices of the kaghan, and in guiding his actions. Many of these were performed because "Heaven so ordained".

Arghun's letters

Arghun expressed the association of Tengri with imperial legitimacy and military success. The majesty (suu) of the khan is a divine stamp granted by Tengri to a chosen individual through which Tengri controls the world order (the presence of Tengri in the khan). In this letter, "Tengri" or "Mongke Tengri" ("Eternal Heaven") is at the top of the sentence. In the middle of the magnified section, the phrase Tengri-yin Kuchin ("Power of Tengri") forms a pause before it is followed by the phrase Khagan-u Suu ("Majesty of the Khan"):

Arghun expressed Tengrism's non-dogmatic side. The name Mongke Tengri ("Eternal Tengri") is at the top of the sentence in this letter to Pope Nicholas IV, in accordance with Mongolian Tengriist writing rules. The words "Tngri" (Tengri) and "zrlg" (zarlig, decree/order) are still written with vowel-less archaism:

Tengrism in the Secret History of the Mongols

Tengri is mentioned many times in the Secret History of the Mongols, written in 1240. The book starts by listing the ancestors of Genghis Khan starting from Borte Chino (Blue Wolf) born with "destiny from Tengri". Borte Chino was either a heavenly wolf, a real man with the totemic name of a wolf or Modu Chanyu. Bodonchar Munkhag the 9th generation ancestor of Genghis Khan is called a "son of Tengri". When Temujin was brought to the Qongirat tribe at 9 years old to choose a wife, Dei Setsen of the Qongirat tells Yesugei the father of Temujin (Genghis Khan) that he dreamt of a white falcon, grasping the sun and the moon, come and sit on his hands. He identifies the sun and the moon with Yesugei and Temujin. Temujin then encounters Tengri in the mountains at the age of 12. The Taichiud had come for him when he was living with his siblings and mother in the wilderness, subsisting on roots, wild fruits, sparrows and fish. He was hiding in the thick forest of Terguun Heights. After three days hiding he decided to leave and was leading his horse on foot when he looked back and noticed his saddle had fallen. Temujin says "I can understand the belly strap can come loose, but how can the breast strap also come loose? Is Tengri persuading me?" He waited three more nights and decided to go out again but a tent-sized rock had blocked the way out. Again he said "Is Tengri persuading me?", returned and waited three more nights. Finally he lost patience after 9 days of hunger and went around the rock, cutting down the wood on the other side with his arrow-whittling knife, but as he came out the Taichiud were waiting for him there and promptly captured him. Toghrul later credits the defeat of the Merkits with Jamukha and Temujin to the "mercy of mighty Tengri" (paragraph 113).

Khorchi of the Baarin tells Temujin of a vision given by "Zaarin Tengri" where a bull raises dust and asks for one of his horns back after charging the ger cart of Jamukha (Temujin's rival) while another ox harnessed itself to a big ger cart on the main road and followed Temujin, bellowing "Heaven and Earth have agreed to make Temujin the Lord of the nation and I am now carrying the nation to you". Temujin afterward tells his earliest companions Boorchi and Zelme that they will be appointed to the highest posts because they first followed him when he was "mercifully looked upon by Tengri" (paragraph 125). In the Battle of Khuiten, Buyuruk Khan and Quduga try using zad stones to cause a thunderstorm against Temujin but it backfires and they get stuck in slippery mud. They say "the wrath of Tengri is upon us" and flee in disorder (paragraph 143). Temujin prays to "father Tengri" on a high hill with his belt around his neck after defeating the Taichiud at Tsait Tsagaan Tal and taking 100 horses and 50 breastplates. He says "I haven't become Lord thanks to my own bravery, but I have defeated my enemies thanks to the love of my father mighty Tengri". When Nilqa Sengum the son of Toghrul Khan tries to convince him to attack Temujin, Toghrul says "How can I think evil of my son Temujin? If we think evil of him when he is such a critical support to us, Tengri will not be pleased with us". After Nilqa Sengum throws a number of tantrums Toghrul finally relents and says "I was afraid of Tengri and said how can I harm my son. If you are really capable, then you decide what you need to do".

When Boorchi and Ogedei return wounded from the battle against Toghrul, Genghis Khan strikes his chest in anguish and says "May Eternal Tengri decide" (paragraph 172). Genghis Khan tells Altan and Khuchar "All of you refused to become Khan, that is why I led you as Khan. If you would have become Khan I would have charged first in battle and brought you the best women and horses if high Khukh Tengri showed us favor and defeated our enemies". After defeating the Keraits Genghis Khan says "By the blessing of Eternal Tengri I have brought low the Kerait nation and ascended the high throne" (paragraph 187). Genghis sends Subutai with an iron cart to pursue the sons of Togtoa and tells him "If you act exposed though hidden, near though far and maintain loyalty then Supreme Tengri will bless you and support you" (paragraph 199). Jamukha tells Temujin "I had no trustworthy friends, no talented brothers and my wife was a talker with great words. That is why I have lost to you Temujin, blessed and destined by Father Tengri." Genghis Khan appoints Shikhikhutug chief judge of the Empire in 1206 and tells him "Be my eyes to see and ears to hear when I am ordering the empire through the blessing of Eternal Tengri" (paragraph 203). Genghis Khan appoints Muqali "Gui Wang" because he "transmitted the word of Tengri when I was sitting under the spreading tree in the valley of Khorkhunag Jubur where Hotula Khan used to dance" (paragraph 206). He gives Khorchi of the Baarin 30 wives because he promised Khorchi he would fulfill his request for 30 wives "if what you say comes true through the mercy and power of Tengri" (paragraph 207).

Genghis mentions both Eternal Tengri and "heaven and earth" when he says "By the mercy of Eternal Tengri and the blessing of heaven and earth I have greatly increased in power, united all the great nation and brought them under my reins" (paragraph 224). Genghis orders Dorbei the Fierce of the Dorbet tribe to "strictly govern your soldiers, pray to Eternal Tengri and try to conquer the Khori Tumed people" (paragraph 240). After being insulted by Asha Khambu of the Tanguts of being a weak Khan Genghis Khan says "If Eternal Tengri blesses me and I firmly pull my golden reins, then things will become clear at that time" (paragraph 256). When Asha Khambu of the Tangut insults him again after his return from the Khwarezmian campaign Genghis Khan says "How can we go back (to Mongolia) when he says such proud words? Though I die I won't let these words slip. Eternal Tengri, you decide" (paragraph 265). After Genghis Khan "ascends to Tengri" (paragraph 268) during his successful campaign against the Tangut (Xi Xia) the wheels of the returning funeral cart gets stuck in the ground and Gilugdei Baatar of the Sunud says "My horse-mounted divine lord born with destiny from Khukh Tengri, have you abandoned your great nation?" Batu Khan sends a secret letter to Ogedei Khan saying "Under the power of the Eternal Tengri, under the Majesty of my uncle the Khan, we set up a great tent to feast after we had broken the city of Meged, conquered the Orosuud (Russians), brought in eleven nations from all directions and pulled on our golden reins to hold one last meeting before going our separate directions" (paragraph 275).

Contemporary Tengrism

A revival of Tengrism has played a role in search for native spiritual roots and Pan-Turkism ideology since the 1990s, especially, in Kyrgyzstan, Kazakhstan, Mongolia, some autonomous republics of the Russian Federation (Tatarstan, Bashkortostan, Buryatia, Yakutia, and others), among the Crimean Karaites and Crimean Tatars.

After the 1908 Young Turk Revolution, and especially after the proclamation of the Republic in 1923, a nationalist ideology of Turanism and Kemalism contributed to the revival of Tengrism. Islamic censorship was abolished, which allowed an objective study of the pre-Islamic religion of the Turks. The Turkish language was purified of Arabic, Persian and other borrowings. A number of figures, while they did not officially abandon Islam, adopted Turkic names, such as Mustafa Kemal Atatürk (Atatürk — "father of Turks") and the historian of religion and ideologist of the Kemalist regime Ziya Gökalp (Gökalp — "sky hero").

The prominent Turkish writer and historian Nihal Atsız was Tengrist and the ideologue of Turanism. The followers of Tengrism in the paramilitary organisation Grey Wolves, mainly inspired by his work, replace the Arabic designation of the god "Allah" with the Turkish "Tanri" in the oath and pronounce: "Tanrı Türkü Korusun" (Tengri, bless the Türks!).

The poet, literary critic and Turkologist Olzhas Suleimenov, the eulogist of the Kazakh national identity, in his book AZ-and-IA that was banned after publication in 1975 in Soviet Kazakhstan, USSR, presented Tengrism ("Tengrianstvo") as one of the most ancient religions in the world.

Tengrism has very few active adherents, but its revival of an ethnic religion reached a larger audience in intellectual circles. Former Presidents of Kazakhstan Nursultan Nazarbayev and Kyrgyzstan Askar Akayev have called Tengrism the national, "natural" religion of the Turkic peoples. So, during the 2002 trip to Khakassia, Russia, Akayev spoke out that a visit to the Yenisei River and the runic steles constituted "a pilgrimage to a holy place for the Kyrgyz" just as the pilgrimage to Mecca. Presenting Islam as foreign to the Turkic peoples, as Semitic religion together with Christianity and Judaism, adherents are found primarily among the nationalistic parties of Central Asia. Tengrism may be interpreted as a Turkic version of Russian neopaganism, which is already well-established. It is partly similar to the new religious movements, such as New Age.

In Tatarstan, the only Tengrist periodical Beznen-Yul (Our Path) appeared in 1997, and also works a theorist of Tengrist movement Rafael Bezertinov. He writes:
Today it's hard to even say who the modern Turks and Mongols. Their names are 90% Arabic, Persian, Greek, Jewish, etc; religion is Semitic (Arabic, Christian, Jewish) and Indian; many do not know their philosophy and traditions; live by the laws and lifestyle of the West; clothes and their food is western; the alphabet is western; forgotten your kind and ancestors; they do not know the history of their folk; many city residents do not speak their native language. Who are they really and what do they have own for today? Only hereditary genes ...

The Yakut philologist Lazar Afanasyev-Teris, PhD founded Tengrist organisation "Kut-Siur" (now Aiyy Faith) in 1990–1993. The headquarters of the International Fund of Tengri Research is also located in Yakutsk.

Several Kyrgyz politicians are advocating Tengrism to fill a perceived ideological void. Dastan Sarygulov, secretary of state and former chair of the Kyrgyz state gold-mining company, established in 2005 the Tengir Ordo—a civic group promoting the values and traditions of Tengrism—and an International scientific center of Tengrist studies. He based on the ideas of one of the first ideologists of pre-Islamic religion in the post-Soviet space, the Kyrgyz writer Choiun Omuraliyev alias Choiun uulu Omuraly, described in his book Tengrism (1994).

Another Kyrgyz proponent of Tengrism, Kubanychbek Tezekbaev, was prosecuted for inciting religious and ethnic hatred in 2011 with statements in an interview describing Kyrgyz mullahs as "former alcoholics and murderers".

At the same time, the Kyrgyz authorities do not go for the official registration of "Tengirchilik" (Теңирчилик) and other Tengrist associations.

The ideology of de-Judaization and the revival of Tengrism is imbued with the works of the leaders of the Crimean Karaites and Krymchaks of Crimea, who traditionally professed forms of Judaism (Igor Achkinazi (1954–2006),  (1922–2019), and others).

They are related to Tengrism or are part of it also movements within the framework of the anti-shamanistic Burkhanism (Ak Jang) that arose in 1904 in Altai (its famous proponents were the painter Grigory Gurkin and poet , 1938–2020)  and the ethnic faith Vattisen Yaly in Chuvashia, Russia.

Some of the Slavic Bulgarian proponents of the Native Faith in Bulgaria identify themselves with the descendants of the Turkic Bulgars and revive Tengrism. They are incorporated into the "Tangra Warriors Movement" (Bulgarian: Движение "Воини на Тангра").

Articles on Tengrism have been published in social-scientific journals. In 2003 in Bishkek, the Tengir Ordo Foundation held the first international scientific symposium on Tengrism "Tengrism—the worldview of the Altaic peoples". The conference "Tengrism as a new factor for the identity construction in Central Asia" was organized by the French Institute for Central Asia Studies in Almaty, Kazakhstan, 25 February 2005. Since 2007, every two years, International scientific conferences "Tengrism and the epic heritage of Eurasian nomads: origins and modernity" have been held in Russia, Mongolia and other countries (the first was sponsored by the Ministry of Culture and Spiritual Development of the Sakha Republic (Yakutia)).

Symbols and holy places

A symbol used by many Tengrists, representing the runic spelling of god Tengri and "shangrak" (an equilateral cross in a circle), depicting the roof opening of a yurt, and a shaman's drum.

Many world-pictures and symbols are attributed to folk religions of Central Asia and Russian Siberia. Shamanistic religious symbols in these areas are often intermixed. For example, drawings of world-pictures on Altaic shamanic drums.

See also:
Flag of Chuvashia
Flag of Kazakhstan
Flag of Kyrgyzstan
Flag of Sakha Republic
Göktürk coins
Gun Ana — the sun (featured in most flags)
Tree of Life

The tallest mountain peaks usually became sacred places. Since the time of the Turkic Khaganate, this is Otgontenger in Mongolia—perhaps, the Otuken of the old inscriptions, state ceremonies are held were. Among others: Belukha (or Üch-Sümer) in Russia's Altai, Khan Tengri alias Jengish Chokusu in Kyrgyzstan (not to be confused with the modern Khan Tengri), and Burkhan Khaldun in Mongolia, associated with the name of Genghis Khan. Symbolic mountains are man-made shrines-ovoos.

Beliefs

Tengrism was an animistic all-encompassing system of belief that includes medicine, religion, a reverence of nature, and ancestor worship. Turkic spiritual wisdom has no finalized condition, but is dialogical and discursive. Tengrism as a monotheistic religion developed only at the imperial level in aristocratic circles.

Gods

Tengrism is centered on the worship of the Tengri (gods) and the sky deity Tengri (Heaven, God of Heaven).  This is similar to Taoism and Tengri is often linked to the Chinese Tian. Kök Tengri (Blue Sky) is the sky deity and often considered as the highest god, similar to Susanoo. It is known as Tangara to the Yakut. While Gök Tengri always remains abstract, never depicted in anthropomorphic or zoomorphic forms, other deities are often personified.

Other deities include:

Umay (The Turkic root umāy originally meant 'placenta, afterbirth') is the goddess of fertility and virginity. Umay resembles earth-mother goddesses found in various other world religions and is the daughter of Tengri.
Öd Tengri is the god of time being not well-known, as it states in the Orkhon stones, "Öd tengri is the ruler of time" and a son of Kök Tengri.
Boz Tengri, like Öd Tengri, is not known much. He is seen as the god of the grounds and steppes and is a son of Kök Tengri.
Kayra is the Spirit of God. Primordial god of highest sky, upper air, space, atmosphere, light, life and son of Kök Tengri.
Ülgen is the son of Kayra and Umay and is the god of goodness. The Aruğ (Arı) denotes "good spirits" in Turkic and Altaic mythology. They are under the order of Ülgen and do good things on earth.
Mergen is the son of Kayra and the brother of Ülgen. He represents mind and intelligence. He sits on the seventh floor of the sky. Since he knows everything, he can afford everything.
Erlik is the god of death and the underworld, known as Tamag.
Ay Dede is the moon god.

The highest group in the pantheon consisted of 99 tngri (55 of them benevolent or "white" and 44 terrifying or "black"); 77 "earth-spirits"; and others. The tngri were called upon only by leaders and great shamans and were common to all the clans. After these, three groups of ancestral spirits dominated. The "Lord-Spirits" were the souls of clan leaders to whom any member of a clan could appeal for physical or spiritual help. The "Protector-Spirits" included the souls of great shamans and shamanesses. The "Guardian-Spirits" were made up of the souls of smaller shamans and shamanesses and were associated with a specific locality (including mountains, rivers, etc.) in the clan's territory. Non-human beings (İye), neither necessarily personified nor deitified, are revered as sacred essence of things. These beings include natural phenomena such as sacred trees or mountains.

Three-world cosmology

The Tengrist cosmology proposes a division between the upper worlds (heaven), the Earth, and the world of darkness (underworld). These worlds are inhabited by different beings, often spirits or deities. A shaman (kam) could through mental powers communicate with these spirits. The worlds are not entirely separated, they have constant influence on the Earth.

In Turkic mythology within Siberian Central Asian religious systems there is the "celestial world", the ground to which "Earth-Water" (Yer-Su) belongs too, and the "underworld" ruled by the spirits beneath the earth. They are connected through the "Tree of Worlds" or Tree of Life in the center of the worlds.

The celestial and the subterranean world are divided into seven layers, although there are variations (the underworld sometimes nine layers and the celestial world 17 layers). Shamans can recognize entries to travel into these realms. In the multiples of these realms, there are beings, living just like humans on the earth. They also have their own respected souls and shamans and nature spirits. Sometimes these beings visit the earth, but are invisible to people. They manifest themselves only in a strange sizzling fire or a bark to the shaman.

Heavenly world

The heavens are inhabited by righteous souls, the Creator and the protector deities. The celestial world has many similarities with the earth, but as undefiled by humans. There is a healthy, untouched nature here, and the natives of this place have never deviated from the traditions of their ancestors. This world is much brighter than the earth and is under the auspices of Ulgen another son of Tengri. Shamans can also visit this world.

On some days, the doors of this heavenly world are opened and the light shines through the clouds. During this moment, the prayers of the shamans are most influential. A shaman performs his imaginary journey, which takes him to the heavens, by riding a black bird, a deer or a horse or by going into the shape into these animals. Otherwise he may scale the World-Tree or pass the rainbow to reach the heavenly world.

Subterranean world

The underworld is the abode of wicked souls, devils and evil deities. There are many similarities between the earth and the underworld and its inhabitants resemble humans, but have only two souls instead of three. They lack the "Ami soul", that produces body temperature and allows breathing. Therefore, they are pale and their blood is dark. The sun and the moon of the underworld give far less light than the sun and the moon of the earth. There are also forests, rivers and settlements underground.

Erlik Khan (Mongolian: Erleg Khan), one of the sons of Tengri, is the ruler of the underworld. He controls the souls here, some of them waiting to be reborn again. Extremely evil souls were believed to be extinguished forever in Ela Guren. If a sick human is not dead yet, a shaman can move to the underworld to negotiate with Erlik to bring the person back to life. If he fails, the person dies.

Souls
It is believed that people and animals have many souls. Generally, each person is considered to have three souls, but the names, characteristics and numbers of the souls may be different among some of the tribes: For example, Samoyeds, a Uralic tribe living in the north of Siberia, believe that women consist of four and men of five souls. Since animals also have souls, humans must respect animals.

According to Paulsen and Jultkratz, who conducted research in North America, North Asia and Central Asia, two souls of this belief are the same to all people:
 Nefes (Breath or Nafs, life or bodily spirit)
 Shadow soul / Free soul

There are many different names for human souls among the Turks and the Mongols, but their features and meanings have not been adequately researched yet.
 Among Turks: Özüt, Süne, Kut, Sür, Salkin, Tin, Körmös, Yula
 Among Mongols: Sünesün, Amin, Kut, Sülde

In addition to these spirits, Jean Paul Roux draws attention to the "Özkonuk" spirit mentioned in the writings from the Buddhist periods of the Uighurs.

Julie Stewart, who devoted her life to research in Mongolia described the belief in the soul in one of her articles:
 Amin: Provides breathing and body temperature. It is the soul which invigorates. (The Turkish counterpart is probably Özüt)
 Sünesün: Outside of the body, this soul moves through water. It is also the part of soul, which reincarnates. After a human died, this part of the soul moves to the world-tree. When it is reborn, it comes out of a source and enters the new-born. (Also called Süne ruhu among Turks)
 Sülde: It is the soul of the self that gives a person a personality. If the other souls leave the body, they only loss consciousness, but if this soul leaves the body, the human dies. This soul resides in nature after death and is not reborn.

Tengrism and Buddhism

The 17th century Mongolian chronicle Altan Tobchi (Golden Summary) contains references to Tengri. Tengrism was assimilated into Mongolian Buddhism while surviving in purer forms only in far-northern Mongolia. Tengrist formulas and ceremonies were subsumed into the state religion. This is similar to the fusion of Buddhism and Shinto in Japan. The Altan Tobchi contains the following prayer at its very end: 

The figure of the God of War (Daichin Tengri) was iconographically depicted in Buddhist-influenced form and carried into battle by certain armies even in the modern era. During the Napoleonic Wars the Kalmyk prince Serebzhab Tyumen (1774-1858) and 500 Kalmyks of his Second Cavalry Regiment, as well as 500 Kalmyks of the First Regiment of Prince Jamba-Taishi Tundutov, carried the yellow banner of Daichin Tengri (as well as Okhin Tengri) through the battles of Borodino, Warsaw, Leipzig, Fère-Champenoise (1814) as well as the capture of Paris. In early 1921 the Buddhist Baron Roman von Ungern-Sternberg (1886-1921) was reportedly recognized as the God of War (Daichin Tengri) by the Bogd Khan of Mongolia. James Palmer in his book "The Bloody White Baron" quotes Ossendowski who claims that Baron Ungern's imminent death in 130 days was foretold on three separate occasions. First by two monks in the "Shrine of Prophecies" of Urga (Ulaanbaatar) who cast dice and came up with the number 130, then by the Bogd Khan himself who said "You will not die but you will be incarnated in the highest form of being. Remember that, Incarnated God of War, Khan of grateful Mongolia" and finally by a female shaman in the ger of the Buryat prince Djambolon. Ossendowski relates:

Tengrism and Islam
Tengrism is based on personal relationship with the gods and spirits and personal experiences, which cannot be fixiated in writings; thus there can be no prophet, holy scripture, place of worship, clergy, dogma, rite and prayers. In contrast, orthodox Islam is based on a written corpus. Doctrines and religious law derive from the Quran and are explained by hadith. In this regard, both belief systems are fundamentally distinct.

When Turks converted to Islam, they probably assimilated their beliefs to Islam via Sufism, identifying Dervishes as something akin to shamans. In the writings of Ahmad Yasawi, both Tengrist elements as well as Islamic themes can be found. For example, Muhammad features as the prototype of human's way to unite with God, while simultaneously referring to God as both kok tangir (Gök Tengri) or Allah. According to Yasawi, humans should seek to purify their soul to harmonize with God and the world. Turkic and Mongolian people in Central Asian largely converted to Islam during the fourteenth Century. However, they were not focusing on the laws, memorization and conformity offered by Islam, but were focused on the inwardly and personal experience. Thus, many scholars argued for a syncretism between Orthodox-Islam, Sufism, and pre-IslamicTurkic religion.

Recently, the syncretism-theory has been challenged. Scholars argued that an orthodox Islam simply did not existed during the Medieval period and has been a product of Modernization, thus there has been no strong distinction between Islam and Pre-Islamic Turkic beliefs when the first Turkic empires converted. First contact between shamanistic Turks and Islam took place during the Battle of Talas against the Chinese Tang dynasty.  Many shamanistic beliefs were considered as genuinely Islamic by many average Muslims and are still prevalent today. Turkic Tengrism further influenced parts of Sufism and Folk Islam, especially Alevism with Bektashi Order, whose affiliation to Islam became disputed in the late Ottoman period.

Modern Tengrists see themselves as separate from the Abrahamic religions. According to some modern believers, by praying to the god of Islam the Turkic peoples would give their energy to the Jews and not to themselves (Aron Atabek). It excludes the experiences of other nations, but offers Semitic history as if it were the history of all humanity. The principle of submission (both in Islam as well as in Christianity) is disregarded as one of the major failings. It allows rich people to abuse the ordinary people and makes human development stagnant. They advocate Turanism and abandonment of Islam as an Arab religion (Nihal Atsız and others). Prayer from the heart can only be in native language, not Arabic. On the contrary, others assert that Tengri is indeed synonymous with Allah and that Turkic ancestors did not leave their former belief behind, but simply accepted Allah as new expression for Tengri. Shoqan Walikhanov asserts, only the names but not the thoughts became Islamic. Thus, "Gök Tengri" (the "blue Sky") was called Allah, the "spirit of the earth" Shaitan, demons became div, peri or jinn, but the idea behind them remained shamanic.

Aron Atabek draws attention to how the Islamization of the Kazakhs and other Turkic peoples was carried out: runic letters were destroyed, physically persecuted shamans, national musical instruments were burned and playing on them was condemned, etc.

Muslim Turkic scholar Mahmud al-Kashgari, around the year 1075, whom he considered Tengrists as "infidel", offered this view: "The infidels — may God destroy them! — call the sky Tengri, also anything that is imposing in their eyes call Tengri, such as a great mountain or tree, and they bow down to such things."

Sociologist Rakhat Achylova studied how aspects of Tengrism were adopted into a Kyrgyz form of Islam.

Tengrism and Christianity
Hulegu Khan sent a letter in Latin to King Louis IX of France on April 10, 1262, from his capital Maragheh in Iran. Kept in the Vienna National Library as MS 339 it is both an invitation for joint operations against the Mamluks as well as an imperious command to submit. The letter provides key insights into the Mongols' understanding of Tengrism's relationship to Christianity as well as furnishing one of the first Latin transcriptions of Tengri. Only a few sentences from the lengthy letter are shown below (those with relevancy to Tengrism): 

The letter largely propounds the usual Mongol ideology and understanding of Tengrism with mentions of the supreme shaman Kokochu Teb Tengri. All meanings of Tengri including the sky, the most high God and "a god" are implied in the letter. Jesus Christ is called Misicatengrin or Messiah-Tengri in the letter. The Misica is from Syriac mshiha (Messiah, Christ) as opposed to Arabic masih. Another Syriac word in the letter is Barachmar (greetings). This points to the well-known Nestorian heritage within the Mongol Empire which used Syriac as its liturgical language. The Mongolian letter of Arghun Khan to Pope Nicholas IV (1290) also uses the word Misica for Christ. William of Rubruck reported that Arig Boke, brother of Hulegu Khan, used the word Messiah near Karakorum in 1254 (Then they began to blaspheme against Christ, but Arabuccha stopped them saying: "You must not speak so, for we know that the Messiah is God"). There are elements of syncretism between Tengrism and Nestorian Christianity with overlapping notions of monotheism and a traditional view of Christ as Misicatengrin probably dating back to the Keraite conversion in 1007. In Hulegu's letter Tengrism takes the overarching, non-dogmatic role and contains Nestorianism as a compatible subset, in line with the religious pluralism practiced by the Mongols. Hulegu himself was not strictly a Christian, although his wife, his general Kitbuqa and mother were Nestorians. He was a Tengriist whose Nestorian interests were of the Mongol, syncretic type. His successor Abaqa Khan would take part in the Ninth Crusade with the future King Edward of England in 1271 and also storm the Krak des Chevaliers in February 1281 with the Hospitallers of Margat.

See also

 Nardoqan
 Heaven worship
 Hungarian Native Faith
 Manzan Gurme Toodei
 Native American religion
 Religion in China
 List of Tengrist movements
 List of Tengrist states and dynasties
 Uralic neopaganism

Footnotes

Bibliography

Secondary sources 

 
 
 
 
 
 
 
 
 
 
 
 
 
 
 
 
 
 
 
 —— (2005). 'Political Background of the Old Turkic Religion' in: Oelschlägel,   Nentwig,   Taube (eds), "Roter Altai, gib dein Echo!" (FS Taube), Leipzig, pp. 260–65. 
 
 
 
 
 
 
 
 
 
 
 
 
  Vol. 149 (149-1), pp. 49–82; Vol. 149 (149-2), pp. 197–230; Vol. 150 (150-1), pp. 27–54; Vol. 150 (150-2), pp. 173–212.
 ——. Tengri. In: Encyclopedia of Religion, Vol. 13, pp. 9080–82.

Modern Tengrist authors

Further reading
 Shaimerdinova, N. "Tengrism in the life of Turkic peoples". In: Religion and State in the Altaic World: Proceedings of the 62nd Annual Meeting of the Permanent International Altaistic Conference (PIAC), Friedensau, Germany, August 18–23, 2019. Edited by Oliver Corff, Berlin, Boston: De Gruyter, 2022, pp. 177–182. https://doi.org/10.1515/9783110730562-016

External links
 International Fund of Tengri Research — official website 
 TÜRIK BITIG — Turkic Inscriptions and Manuscripts, and Learn Old Turkic Writings — website of Language Committee of Ministry of Culture and Information of the Republic of Kazakhstan 

 
Turkic mythology
Asian shamanism
Asian ethnic religion
Polytheism
Mongol mythology
Mongolian shamanism
Siberian shamanism